The Battleship Island is a 2017 South Korean period action film starring Hwang Jung-min, So Ji-sub, Song Joong-ki and Lee Jung-hyun. It is a Japanese occupation-era film about an attempted prison break from a forced labor camp on Hashima Island.

Synopsis 
Set during Imperial Japan’s occupation of Korea during World War 2, a group of over 400 Koreans endure harsh forced labor on Hashima Island and risk their lives to attempt a daring escape.

Cast

Main
Hwang Jung-min as Lee Kang-ok

A bandmaster at a hotel in Gyeongseong, who chooses to take his only daughter to Japan in order to keep her safe. But they get sent to the Hashima labor camp instead, and there he'll do anything that's asked of him, as long as he can protect his daughter.
So Ji-sub as Choi Chil-sung

The best street fighter in Gyeongseong, a coarse man who constantly stirs up troubles in the labor camp. Under his harsh and rough exterior, he has a good heart.
Song Joong-ki as Park Moo-young

A member of the Korean independence movement who infiltrates the island in order to rescue a fellow independence fighter being held captive there.
Lee Jung-hyun as Oh Mal-nyeon
A comfort woman who gets moved to Hashima after going through endless troubles under Japanese occupation, but never loosens her strong grip on hope.

Supporting
Kim Su-an as Lee So-hee
Lee Kang-ok's daughter. She was being captured by Japanese general because of her talents in singing and dancing.
Kim Bo-yoon as Joseon girl
Kwon Han-sol as Joseon girl
Ham Sung-min as Bok-jin's group
Lee Geung-young
Lee Jung-eun
Yoon Kyung-ho as Dauber
Bae Seung-cheol
Jang Sung-bum
Kim Jun-han
Kim Won-hae
Kim Ye-eun
Bae Je-gi
 Kim Dong-young as a gambler.

Production 
Filming began June 17, 2016 in Cheongju, South Korea and finished on December 20, 2016. The film reunites Hwang Jung-min with Ryoo Seung-wan, who directed the 2015 hit movie Veteran starring Hwang. Production cost about five times more than the average locally produced film due to the massive lifelike sets. While the island provided the inspiration for the plot, The Battleship Island was not filmed on location. The sets were built in Chuncheon and were designed to resemble the conditions of Hashima Island's community and mines during the 1940s.

Historical accuracy  
Japanese media, such as the Sankei Shimbun newspaper, have attacked the film accusing it of distorting historic truth. In response, director Ryoo Seung-wan has stated that "the film is a fact-based fiction" based on records as well as first hand testimony of surviving victims regarding their lack of payments, abusive treatment, working conditions leading to death of laborers from diseases, malnutrition, and accidents. The writer-director revealed that the film was not made to stir nationalism or an anti-Japanese sentiment and to show "how war can make man a monster".

Initially, Japan acknowledged Korean and Chinese forced laborers were there during World War II in its application to UNESCO for World Heritage status for Hashima Island. The acknowledgement was a response to South Korean opposition to the bid stating, "large number[s] of Koreans and others [...] were brought against their will and forced to work under harsh conditions in the 1940s at some of the sites [including Hashima island]". However, once Hashima Island was approved as a UNESCO World Heritage Site, Japanese Foreign Minister Fumio Kishida made statements contradicting the earlier acknowledgement of the existence of forced laborers stating, "[forced to work under harsh conditions] by the Japanese government representative did not mean forced labor". Although the UNESCO's World Heritage Committee had required the establishment of a monitoring mechanism to measure the degree to which Hashima Island victims are remembered, the island's official tourism website and tour program - operated by Nagasaki City - makes no mention of forced laborers and currently does not make any efforts to comply with promised UNESCO requirements.

Release  
The Battleship Island was first promoted at the European Film Market in February 2017 and then at the Cannes Film Festival in May. As of June 2017, it has been sold to 113 countries, including North American countries as well as France, Italy, Russia, Turkey, Malaysia, Taiwan, Indonesia, Japan, Hong Kong, Singapore and Thailand. On June 16, 2017, an official press conference was held at the National Museum of Korea to launch the film.

The film has been invited to compete at 2017 Sitges International Fantastic Film Festival of Catalonia in Spain. The film will be shown in the Orbita section for introducing most notable films of the year and honouring a title chosen by the jury composed of audiences. This is the sixth film by director Ryoo Seung-wan to be selected for a screening at this film festival.

Special screenings
On July 25, 2017, a special pre-screening was held for foreign diplomats in South Korea.

On July 28, 2017, a special screening was held for UNESCO officials and diplomats in Paris at the headquarters of Metropolitan Filmexport. The aim was to raise awareness into the hidden history of Hashima Island and shed light on the harsh labour and living conditions imposed upon Koreans at the underground coal mining factory on the island during Japan’s rule of Korea.

Reception

Critical response 
The Battleship Island holds a 67% approval rating by 15 reviewers on aggregator website Rotten Tomatoes with a weighted average of 4.3/5 and 6.3/10, respectively. On Metacritic, the film has a score of 60 out of 100 based on 4 critics, indicating "mixed or average reviews".

The New York Times noted that the film "vividly conveys the pain of a national wartime trauma whose scars clearly have not healed." Although some aspects of the violence and overly-theatrical storylines were criticized, critics have praised the camera work and Ryoo for his effective use of a large-scale action set.

Box office 
The film was released on 26 July 2017 in South Korea. According to the Korean Film Council, The Battleship Island created a new record with reaching 970,516 viewers on its opening night. During the first weekend (July 28 to 30) since the movie was released, an audience of 2.5 million was attracted. This resulted in box-office earnings of USD 18.57 million from 2,027 screens, representing 37.1% of total movie theaters in the country. This marked the first time in the country that a movie had been released on more than 2,000 screens, creating controversy over screen dominance by conglomerates.

In its second week of release, the film was surpassed by the historical action drama film A Taxi Driver. By the end of the eighth day since the film was released, it was playing at 1,108 venues for a total of 5.18 million viewers. The number of admissions surpassed 6 million on the 12th day of its run. As of September 26, or two months after opening in the box office, overall admission was 6.58 million.

Accolades

References

External links

Official Website 

The Battleship Island at Daum
The Battleship Island at Naver Movies
The Battleship Island at Movist

2017 films
2010s historical action films
2010s Korean-language films
South Korean epic films
South Korean historical action films
Anti-Japanese sentiment in Korea
CJ Entertainment films
Films set in Korea under Japanese rule
2017 drama films
Japan in non-Japanese culture
Films about father–daughter relationships
2010s South Korean films